The 2016 Sudan Premier League is the 45th season of top-tier football in Sudan. The season began in January 2016. Al-Merrikh SC are the defending champions, having won their 16th championship.

The league comprises 18 teams, the bottom three of which will be relegated to regional leagues for 2017.

Teams

Stadiums and locations

League table

Sudan Premier League seasons
Sudan
football